Ze'ev Casspi is a former Israeli footballer who played 20 years for Maccabi Netanya.

Career
Casspi was born in Tiberias and moved to Netanya with his family in 1932. While at school, he and his brother Yitzhak were discovered by Jewish sport pioneer Walter Frankl, and Casspi began training in Athletics with Hapoel Netanya and in football with Maccabi Netanya.

Casspi represented Israel in the 3rd and 4th Maccabiah Games, winning gold medals in Javelin throw and decathlon, but was forced to retire due to a car accident in 1953. After recovery, in 1955, Casspi return to play for Maccabi Netanya, where he played until the end of the 1968–69 season, when he moved to Beitar Netanya, where he played the following season and retired from football in fall 1970.

After retirement, Casspi continued to be involved in Maccabi Netanya, serving in its management board and helping to establish the club's handball team.

Honors
Liga Alef (second tier):
1963–64

References

Living people
Israeli Jews
Israeli footballers
Maccabi Netanya F.C. players
Beitar Netanya F.C. players
Liga Leumit players
Footballers from Netanya
Israeli people of Iranian-Jewish descent
Maccabiah Games gold medalists for Israel
Maccabiah Games silver medalists for Israel
Maccabiah Games bronze medalists for Israel
Association football goalkeepers
Year of birth missing (living people)
Maccabiah Games medalists in athletics
Israeli male javelin throwers
Israeli male high jumpers